Roger Joseph Kiley (October 23, 1900 – September 6, 1974) was an American football player and later a United States circuit judge of the United States Court of Appeals for the Seventh Circuit.

Education and career
Born in Chicago, Kiley received a Bachelor of Laws from Notre Dame Law School in 1923. He was a college athletic coach from 1922 to 1932, as an assistant coach at the University of Notre Dame in 1923, as head coach at Loyola University Chicago from 1923 to 1927, and as an assistant coach at Auburn University from 1927 to 1932. He was a professional football player for the Chicago Cardinals in 1923. He was in private practice of law in Chicago from 1933 to 1940. He was a member of the Chicago Board of Alderman from 1933 to 1940. He was a Judge of the Superior Court of Cook County in Illinois in 1940. He was a Judge of the Illinois Appellate Court for the First District in Chicago from 1941 to 1961.

College football career
A native of Chicago, Kiley was a prominent end for Knute Rockne's Notre Dame Fighting Irish, and one of the sports' first great pass catchers, paired with Eddie Anderson and catching passes from George Gipp. Kiley was hired from Notre Dame in January 1923 to serve as head coach at Loyola University Chicago. He served as head coach at Loyola through the second game of their 1928 season when he resigned to return to a private law practice.

Head coaching record

Federal judicial service

Kiley was nominated by President John F. Kennedy on June 20, 1961, to a seat on the United States Court of Appeals for the Seventh Circuit vacated by Judge William Lynn Parkinson. He was confirmed by the United States Senate on June 27, 1961, and received his commission on June 30, 1961. He assumed senior status on January 1, 1974. His service was terminated on September 6, 1974, due to his death in River Forest, Illinois.

References

External links
 
 

1900 births
1974 deaths
American football ends
Baseball second basemen
Forwards (basketball)
Auburn Tigers football coaches
Chicago Cardinals players
Loyola Ramblers football coaches
Notre Dame Fighting Irish baseball players
Notre Dame Fighting Irish men's basketball players
Notre Dame Fighting Irish football coaches
Notre Dame Fighting Irish football players
All-American college football players
20th-century American judges
Chicago City Council members
Illinois state court judges
Judges of the Illinois Appellate Court
Judges of the United States Court of Appeals for the Seventh Circuit
United States court of appeals judges appointed by John F. Kennedy
Players of American football from Chicago
Baseball players from Chicago
Basketball players from Chicago
American men's basketball players
Judges of the Superior Court of Cook County